Chhota haazri or Chota hazri (from the Hindustani words for "small" and "presence") was a meal served in households and barracks, particularly in northern British India, shortly after dawn. 

In subsequent years, the tradition of such a meal has disappeared, but the phrase lives on in Anglo-Indian households, certain regiments of the Indian Army, and in public schools —such as The Doon School, Dehradun, Colonel Brown Cambridge School, Dehradun , Mayo College, Ajmer, Lawrence School, Sanawar, Lawrence School, Lovedale and St. Paul's School, Darjeeling, where it has come to refer to a cup of tea with a biscuit served at 6:00 a.m.

Historical use of the word
In 1912 explorer Aurel Stein wrote the following during an expedition across the mountains of Pashtunistan:

In The Jim Corbett omnibus in the man-eating leopard of Rudraprayag Jim Corbett wrote the following during the leopard hunt:

In 1947, during the political integration of the Indian princely states, the word 'Chhota Hazri' was used as a pun to refer to a small princely state in an ironic way.

'Chota Hazri' was the name of a highly successful thoroughbred horse in British Horse racing around mid twentieth century.

References

Bibliography
 Chhota Hazri Days: A Dosco's Yatra by Sanjiv Bathla, Rupa & Co., 2010 .

External links
St. Paul's School, Darjeeling Encyclopedia - Chota Hazri
Chhotahazri

Indian cuisine
Hindustani language
Historical foods
North Indian cuisine
Indian English idioms